Langdon Park School is a co-educational comprehensive secondary school and sixth form, located in the Poplar area of the London Borough of Tower Hamlets, England.

It is a community school administered by Tower Hamlets London Borough Council, and also has specialist Sports College status.

The school operates a sixth form provision in consortium with Bow School, St Paul's Way Trust School and Mulberry Stepney Green Maths, Computing and Science College. The sixth form consortium is known as Sixth Form East.

Notable former pupils
Dizzee Rascal, rapper and musician
Alex Scott (footballer, born 1984), Women Footballer
Lee Bowyer (footballer and manager)
Ilyas 'Liilz' Karim (Music Artist)

References

External links

London Borough of Tower Hamlets – Langdon Park Secondary School

Secondary schools in the London Borough of Tower Hamlets
Community schools in the London Borough of Tower Hamlets